Don Leonard (1925–2002) was a South African film actor.

Career 

He appeared in ten films between 1965 and 1979.

Filmography

References

Further reading 
 Tomaselli, Keyan (1989). The Cinema of Apartheid — Race and Class in South African Film. Routledge (London, England; New York City). .

External links 
 

1925 births
South African male film actors
2002 deaths